The 1984–85 OJHL season is the 13th season of the Ontario Junior Hockey League (OJHL). The eight teams of the league played a 48-game season.  The all eight teams made the playoffs.

The winner of the OJHL playoffs, the Orillia Travelways, were already hosting the 1985 Centennial Cup and were therefore exempted from the Buckland Cup/Dudley Hewitt Cup series against the Northern Ontario Junior Hockey League champion.  Instead, the league finalists, the Aurora Tigers were granted the option of playing for the OHA and Central Canadian Championship.  Both the Tigers and Travelways ended up at the Centennial Cup, which the Travelways won.

Changes
Whitby Lawmen join the OJHL.
Hamilton Mountain A's leave the OJHL.
North York Rangers become the North York Red Wings.

Final standings
Note: GP = Games played; W = Wins; L = Losses; OTL = Overtime losses; SL = Shootout losses; GF = Goals for; GA = Goals against; PTS = Points; x = clinched playoff berth; y = clinched division title; z = clinched conference title

1984-85 OJHL Playoffs

Quarter-final
Orillia Travelways defeated Whitby Lawmen 4-games-to-1
Aurora Tigers defeated North York Red Wings 4-games-to-none
Newmarket Flyers defeated Richmond Hill Dynes 4-games-to-2
Markham Waxers defeated Dixie Beehives 4-games-to-1
Semi-final
Aurora Tigers defeated Newmarket Flyers 4-games-to-3
Orillia Travelways defeated Markham Waxers 4-games-to-none
Final
Orillia Travelways defeated Aurora Tigers 4-games-to-none

OHA Buckland Cup/Dudley Hewitt Cup Championship
The 1985 Buckland Cup and Dudley Hewitt Cup was a best-of-7 series between the Sudbury Cubs (NOJHL) and the Aurora Tigers.  The Tigers played because the Orillia Travelways were granted an opt-out as hosts of the 1985 Centennial Cup.  The winner moved on to the 1985 Centennial Cup with Orillia.

Aurora Tigers defeated Sudbury Cubs 4-games-to-none
Aurora 12 - Sudbury 5
Aurora 7 - Sudbury 2
Aurora 9 - Sudbury 4
Aurora 6 - Sudbury 2

1985 Centennial Cup Championship
The 1985 Centennial Cup was the Canadian National Junior A championship in Orillia, Ontario, hosted by the Orillia Travelways.  The Orillia Travelways won the event, while the Aurora Tigers lost the semi-final.

Round Robin
Orillia Travelways defeated Cole Harbour Colts (MVJHL) 8-1
Aurora Tigers defeated Penticton Knights (BCJHL) 8-4
Orillia Travelways defeated Aurora Tigers 11-3
Cole Harbour Colts (MVJHL) defeated Aurora Tigers 7-5
Orillia Travelways defeated Penticton Knights (BCJHL) 6-3

Semi-final
Penticton Knights (BCJHL) defeated Aurora Tigers 8-5

Final
Orillia Travelways defeated Penticton Knights (BCJHL) 4-2

Leading Scorers

Players taken in the 1985 NHL Entry Draft
Rd 6 #112	Brian McReynolds -	New York Rangers	(Orillia Travelways)
Rd 6 #123	Danton Cole - 	Winnipeg Jets	(Aurora Tigers)
Rd 10 #200	Brad Hamilton -	Chicago Blackhawks	(Aurora Tigers)

See also
 1985 Centennial Cup
 Dudley Hewitt Cup
 List of OJHL seasons
 Northern Ontario Junior Hockey League
 Central Junior A Hockey League
 Thunder Bay Flyers

References

External links
 Official website of the Ontario Junior Hockey League
 Official website of the Canadian Junior Hockey League

Ontario Junior Hockey League seasons
OPJHL